Punduga is a rural locality (a settlement) in Razinskoye Rural Settlement, Kharovsky District, Vologda Oblast, Russia. The population was 289 as of 2002.

Geography 
Punduga is located 34 km north of Kharovsk (the district's administrative centre) by road. Grudinskaya is the nearest rural locality.

References 

Rural localities in Kharovsky District